Ching Fat is one of the 31 constituencies of the Kwai Tsing District Council in Hong Kong. The seat elects one member of the council every four years. It was first created in the 1994 elections. Its boundary is loosely based on part of Cheung Fat Estate, Ching Nga Court, Ching Tai Court and Ching Wang Court in Tsing Yi with estimated population of 17,863.

Councillors represented

Election results

2010s

References

Constituencies of Hong Kong
Constituencies of Kwai Tsing District Council
1994 establishments in Hong Kong
Constituencies established in 1994
Tsing Yi